is a passenger railway station located in the city of Hadano, Kanagawa Prefecture, Japan.  The station operated by the private railway operator Odakyu Electric Railway.

Lines
Hadano Station is served by the Odakyu Odawara Line, and lies 61.7 rail kilometers from the line's terminal at Shinjuku Station.

Station layout
The station has two island platforms with four tracks, with the station building is constructed on a cantilever above the platforms and tracks.

Platforms

History
It was given its present name on 9 March 1987. The current station building was completed in 1996 and associated department store in 1997. A number of Romancecar express services commenced in 1998.

Station numbering was introduced in January 2014 with Hadano being assigned station number OH39.

Passenger statistics
In fiscal 2019, the station was used by an average of 42,011 passengers daily.

The passenger figures for previous years are as shown below.

Surrounding area
Hadano City Hall
Hadano Red Cross Hospital
Sophia Junior College

See also
List of railway stations in Japan

References

External links

Official home page.

Railway stations in Japan opened in 1927
Odakyu Odawara Line
Railway stations in Kanagawa Prefecture
Hadano, Kanagawa